Rell may refer to:

Jodi Rell (born 1946) American politician, 87th Governor of Connecticut
Hell Rell (born 1979), stage name of Durrell Mohammad  American rap artist
Rell, stage name of Gerrell Gaddis, American R&B singer
Rell Sunn (1950-1998), American surfer
RELL, a model of bus; see Bristol RE
Rell, a Support character in the video game League of Legends

See also
 Rel (disambiguation)